Mung Chiang (born 1977) is a Chinese-American academic administrator, telecommunications engineer, and writer. He currently serves as the 13th President of Purdue University.

Starting January 1, 2023, Chiang became President of Purdue University. He is the youngest president of an AAU university.

Previously he was both Executive Vice President of Purdue University and the John A. Edwardson Dean of its College of Engineering. Previously he was the Arthur LeGrand Doty Professor of Electrical Engineering at Princeton University, and an affiliated faculty in applied and computational mathematics and in computer science. On June 10, 2022, Chiang was named the next President of Purdue University, succeeding Mitch Daniels.

Early life and education
Born in Tianjin and immigrated to Hong Kong and then to the United States, Mung Chiang received his secondary education at Queen's College, Hong Kong. He then received a B.S. (Hons.) in both electrical engineering and mathematics in 1999, M.S. in electrical engineering in 2000, and a Ph.D. in electrical engineering in 2003 at Stanford University.

Career
Chiang became an assistant professor at Princeton University in 2004, an associate professor with tenure in 2008, a professor in 2011, and the Arthur LeGrand Doty Professor of Electrical Engineering in 2013. While at Princeton, Chiang founded the Princeton EDGE Lab in 2009.

In 2015, Mung Chiang, along with Helder Antunes and Tao Zhang, met to discuss the creation of a consortium to promote the standardization of fog computing, which eventually was formed as the OpenFog Consortium.

In 2017, Chiang was named dean of the College of Engineering at Purdue University. He was simultaneously appointed the Roscoe H. George Professor of Electrical and Computer Engineering. At age 40, he is among the youngest in modern history to become the leader of a major college in an American university. Starting in December 2019, Chiang took a one-year leave of absence to serve as the science and technology adviser to the secretary of state Mike Pompeo on an IPA. In 2021, he was named Executive Vice President for Strategic Initiatives at Purdue University while continuing as Dean of College of Engineering. On June 10, 2022, the Purdue University Board of Trustees announced its unanimous election of Chiang to become the university's 13th president on January 1, 2023.

Teaching 
He received the 2016 Distinguished Teaching Award at Princeton University Engineering School.

University leadership 
On May 1, 2017, Purdue University announced that it has chosen Chiang as the next dean of its College of Engineering. He assumed office on July 1, 2017, as the  John A. Edwardson Dean of the College of Engineering at Purdue University. Under his leadership, Purdue Engineering became the largest ever top-5 engineering college in the United States and reached milestones in education, research, fund-raising, physical infrastructure, online learning, industry partnership, economic development, global engagement, diversity and visibility.

On April 23, 2021, Purdue University named Chiang as Executive Vice President for Strategic Initiatives while he continues to lead College of Engineering simultaneously.

On June 10, 2022, Purdue named Chiang its 13th President, effective January 1, 2023.

Awards and honors
 2007 – ONR Young Investigator Award
 2007 – Technology Review TR35 Young Innovator Award
 2008 – Presidential Early Career Award for Scientists and Engineers
 2012 – IEEE Kiyo Tomiyasu Award
 2012 – IEEE INFOCOM Best Paper Award
 2012 – IEEE Fellow
 2013 – Alan T. Waterman Award
 2013 – ASEE Frederick Emmons Terman Award in Engineering Education
 2013 – IEEE SECON Best Paper Award
 2014 – Guggenheim Fellow
 2014 – INFORMS Information Systems Design Science Award
 2016 – Princeton School of Engineering and Applied Sciences (SEAS) Distinguished Teacher Award
 2020 – National Academy of Inventors fellow
 2020 – Royal Swedish Academy of Engineering Sciences international fellow.
 2022 - IEEE INFOCOM Achievement Award

Bibliography
Chiang co-authored a technical undergraduate textbook Networked Life: 20 Questions and Answers (Cambridge University Press, 2012) and a popular science book The Power of Networks: Six Principles That Connect Our Lives (Princeton University Press, 2016). The first book received the PROSE Awards in Science and Technology Writing in 2013 from the Association of American Publishers. The second book was mentioned in various popular media, such as in TIME Magazine.

References

External links 
 Chiang homepage

1977 births
Living people
Alumni of Queen's College, Hong Kong
American science writers
American telecommunications engineers
Chinese emigrants to the United States
Engineers from Tianjin
Fellow Members of the IEEE
Presidents of Purdue University
Princeton University faculty
Purdue University faculty
Stanford University School of Engineering alumni
Stanford University School of Humanities and Sciences alumni
Writers from Tianjin